Bakhit Djibrine (Arabic: بخيت جبرين; born 17 April 1995) is a Chadian professional footballer who plays as a winger for Chad Premier League club Foullah Edifice and the Chad national team.

Honours 
Foullah Edifice

 Chad Premier League: 2013, 2014, 2019

References

External links 
 

1995 births
Living people
People from N'Djamena
Chadian footballers
Association football wingers
Foullah Edifice FC players
Elect-Sport FC players
Chad Premier League players
Chad international footballers